Ferdinando Facchiano (19 August 1927 – 10 October 2022) was an Italian lawyer and politician. A member of the Italian Democratic Socialist Party, he served as Minister for Cultural and Environmental Heritage from 1989 to 1991 and served in the Chamber of Deputies from 1987 to 1994.

Facchiano died in Ceppaloni on 10 October 2022, at the age of 95.

References

1927 births
2022 deaths
20th-century Italian politicians
21st-century Italian politicians
20th-century Italian lawyers
21st-century Italian lawyers
Italian Democratic Socialist Party politicians
Culture ministers of Italy
Deputies of Legislature X of Italy
Deputies of Legislature XI of Italy
University of Naples Federico II alumni
People from the Province of Benevento